Various types of spin-offs and merchandise of the ITV soap opera Emmerdale have been released throughout the show's history, including films, books and documentaries.

Films
This is the list of the direct-to-home-media Emmerdale films that have been released. The character of Marlon Dingle (played by Mark Charnock) is the only one to have appeared in them all.

1997: The Dingles Down Under
1998: Revenge
1999: The Dingles in Venice
2010: The Dingles: For Richer, For Poorer
2011: Paddy and Marlon's Big Night In

Television

Soapstars

An ITV talent show, Soapstars, was broadcast in 2001 to cast a new five-member family on Emmerdale. The judging panel consisted of drama producer Yvon Grace, casting director Paul de Freitas, and Emmerdale scriptwriter Bill Lyons. The five winners made their debut on the show in November that year, and all had left by August 2002.

Documentaries
Emmerdale Family Album was a series of documentary episodes looking at the histories of three Emmerdale families: the Dingles, the Sugdens and the Tates. The episodes aired on ITV in 2005.

Books

Several Emmerdale books, fiction and non-fiction, have been produced, a number written by Lee Mackenzie, the pen name of author Jean Bowden who also wrote as Tessa Barclay, Barbara Annandale and others; and James Ferguson (a pen name of author Peter Walker who (as Nicholas Rhea) also wrote the original novels the TV show Heartbeat is based on. Lance Parkin (who had been a storyliner on the TV show) also wrote a novel in the early 2000s. At least one of these was also translated into Finnish. The book titles for the original, popular series of novelisations, are:
 The Legacy (1) by Lee Mackenzie – stories from the original 1972 episodes
 Prodigal's Progress (2) by Lee Mackenzie – stories from 1973
 All That A Man Has... (3) by Lee Mackenzie – stories from 1973
 Lovers' Meeting (4) by Lee Mackenzie – stories from 1974
 A Sad And Happy Summer (5) by Lee Mackenzie – stories from 1973/1974
 A Sense Of Responsibility (6) by Lee Mackenzie – stories from 1975/1976
 Nothing Stays The Same (7) by Lee Mackenzie – stories from 1976
 The Couple At Demdyke Row (8) by Lee Mackenzie – stories from 1976/1977
 Whispers Of Scandal (9) by Lee Mackenzie – stories from 1977
 Shadows From The Past (10) by Lee Mackenzie – stories from 1977
 Lucky For Some (11) by Lee Mackenzie – stories from 1978
 Face Value (12) by Lee Mackenzie – stories from 1978
 Good Neighbours (13) by Lee Mackenzie – stories from 1978
 Innocent Victim (14) by Lee Mackenzie – stories from 1979
 False Witness (15) by Lee Mackenzie – stories from 1979
 The Homecoming (16) by Lee Mackenzie – stories from 1980
 Old Flames (17) by Lee Mackenzie – stories from 1980/1981
 Wedding Bells (18) by Lee Mackenzie – stories from 1981/1982
 Family Feuds (19) by Lee Mackenzie – stories from 1982
 Young Passions (20) by Lee Mackenzie – stories from 1983
 Another Door Opens (21) by Lee Mackenzie – stories from 1983
 A Friend In Need (22) by James Ferguson – stories from 1983/1984
 Divided Loyalties (23) by James Ferguson – stories from 1984
 Wives And Lovers (24) by James Ferguson – final novel of original series, stories from 1985

There was also
 Annie Sugden's County Diary by Lee Mackenzie – Annie's life in the 1920s until 1945
 Early Days at Emmerdale Farm by Lee Mackenzie – Annie's life from 1945 until the mid-1950s
 Emmerdale: Their Finest Hour by Lance Parkin – Life in Beckindale in 1941

A new series is currently being published
 Christmas at Emmerdale (1) by Pamela Bell – Life in Beckindale in 1914
 Spring Comes To Emmerdale (2) by Pamela Bell – Life in Beckindale through 1918 and beyond
 Emmerdale At War (3) by Pamela Bell – Life in Beckindale in 1940 
 Hope Comes To Emmerdale (4) by Kerry Bell – Life in Beckindale during the Second World War
 The Emmerdale Girls (5) by Kerry Bell - Life in Beckindale as 1944 draws to a close

Episode DVDs

Other
As well as the films, books and episode DVDs there have been other videos and DVDs and memorabilia (often signed by cast members) released, including merchandise relating to The Woolpackers, the Emmerdale band that existed in the 1990s.

References

Spin-Offs
Merchandise